Sherman Glenn Finesilver (October 1, 1927 – October 12, 2006) was a United States district judge of the United States District Court for the District of Colorado.

Education and career

Born in Denver, Colorado, Finesilver received a Bachelor of Arts degree from the University of Colorado Boulder in 1949 and a Juris Doctor from the Sturm College of Law at the University of Denver in 1952. He was in private practice in Denver from 1952 to 1955, and was also an assistant city attorney during that time. He was a judge of the County Court for the City and County of Denver from 1955 to 1962, and of the Colorado Second Judicial District from 1962 to 1971.

Federal judicial service

On September 8, 1971, Finesilver was nominated by President Richard Nixon to a seat on the United States District Court for the District of Colorado vacated by Judge William Edward Doyle. Finesilver was confirmed by the United States Senate on September 21, 1971, and received his commission on September 22, 1971. He served as Chief Judge from 1982 to 1994, assuming senior status on May 31, 1994, and then retiring from the bench entirely on December 31, 1994.

Post judicial service

Following his retirement, Finesilver resumed private practice in Denver until his death on October 12, 2006, in Denver.

See also
 List of Jewish American jurists

References

Sources
 

1927 births
2006 deaths
Judges of the United States District Court for the District of Colorado
United States district court judges appointed by Richard Nixon
20th-century American judges
Colorado state court judges
People from Denver
University of Colorado alumni
Sturm College of Law alumni